The 23rd Street viaduct is an automobile crossing of the Kansas River, and south of the Rock Island Bridge (Kansas City).
It was built in 1921, and rebuilt in 2007.
It is an elevated deck truss, and about 3,000 feet long.
It survived the 1951, and 1993 Kansas City floods.
It has two side approaches, one to the south, one to the north, and rises above the south part of the West Bottoms, and the parking lot to Kemper Arena.
Its real name is the Kansas Avenue Bridge, but, because the primary half of it is in Missouri, it is called the 23rd Street viaduct more than the Kansas Avenue Bridge.

Bridges over the Kansas River
Bridges in Kansas City, Kansas
Bridges completed in 1921
Road bridges in Kansas
Warren truss bridges in the United States